Borzekan or Borzakan may refer to:
 Borzekan, Fars